The Enganglima were a community that occupied and were said to dominate the southern and northern plains of present-day Kenya and Tanzania respectively. They were pushed out of their territory in the early 19th century by the Maasai.

Sources
Ludwig Krapf recorded accounts of the Engánglima from Lemāsěgnǒt whose father was "Engobore, an Mkuafi of the tribe Engánglima" who had "married a woman in the Interior near Oldoinio eibŏr (white mountain)" by whom he got his son, Lemāsěgnǒt. Krapf notes that Engobore resolved to reside at a place called Muasuni which was situated on the upper course of the Pangani river in the vicinity of the kingdom of Usambara when he returned from the interior. Krapf states that "the reason which had induced Engobore to join the nomadic settlement of the Wakuafi tribe Barrabuyu...was because his own tribe Engánglima had during his stay in the interior been nearly annihilated by the wild Masai".

Territory
Krapf noted that the Enganglima territory;

Thompson wrote of the 'Wa-kwafi' and their territory which by his description is roughly contiguous with Engánglima territory as mentioned by Krapf. Thompson states that;

Furthermore, Maasai sources identify the Enganglima as speakers of a Maa language.

Peoples
Krapf's account of his informant alludes to a corporate identity that he refers to as 'Wakuafi' which had within it at least two sections, that he refers to as Engánglima and Barrabuyu.

Conflict
Krapf wrote about conflicts that affected the 'Engánglima' tribe. He notes that they;

According to Thompson's account, a 'series of misfortunes' fell upon the Kwavi about 1830 leading to the eventual collapse of the community. He states that;

Diaspora
According to Thompson's narrative, the Kwavi were not entirely annihilated 'for a large division of the clan kept together, and contrived to cut their way through Kikuyu and to reach Lyikipia where they settled. Another section crossed the meridional trough and reached the opposite half of the plateau in Guas' Ngishu'.

According to his account these conflicts formed part of the Iloikop wars.

References

Ethnic groups in Kenya